A Jantar Mantar (Hindustani pronunciation: [d͡ʒən̪t̪ər mən̪t̪ər]) is an assembly of stone-built astronomical instruments, designed to be used with the naked eye. There were five Jantar Mantars in India, all of them built at the command of the Rajah Jai Singh II, who had a keen interest in mathematics, architecture and astronomy; The largest example is the equinoctial sundial belonging to Jaipur's assembly of instruments, consisting of a gigantic triangular gnomon with the hypotenuse parallel to the Earth's axis.  On either side of the gnomon is a quadrant of a circle, parallel to the plane of the equator.  The instrument can be used with an accuracy of about 2 seconds by a "skilled observer" to measure the time of day, and the declination of the Sun and the other heavenly bodies. It is the world's largest stone sundial, known as the Vrihat Samrat Yantra.
The Jaipur Jantar Mantar is a UNESCO World Heritage Site.

History
In the early 18th century, Maharaja Jai Singh II of Jaipur constructed five Jantar Mantar in total, in New Delhi, Jaipur, Ujjain, Mathura and Varanasi; they were completed between 1724 and 1735.

The Jantar have like  Samrat Yantra, Jai Prakash, Ram Yantra and Niyati Chakra; each of which are used to for various astronomical calculations. The primary purpose of the observatory was to compile astronomical tables and to predict the times and movements of the sun, moon and planets.

List of instruments:

● Samrat Yantra
● Jai Prakash Yantra
● Disha Yantra
● Rama Yantra
● Chakra Yantra
● Rashiwalya Yantra
● Dingash Yantra
● Utaansh Yantra

Name
The name "Jantar Mantar" is at least 200 years old, finding a mention in an account from 1803. However, the archives of Jaipur State, such as accounts from 1735 and 1737–1738, do not use this as Jantra, which in the spoken language is corrupted to Jantar. The word Jantra is derived from yantra, instrument, while the suffix Mantar is derived from mantrana meaning consult or calculate.

See also
Jantar Mantar in Jaipur
Jantar Mantar in New Delhi
Jantar Mantar in Varanasi
Jantar Mantar in Ujjain
List of archaeoastronomical sites sorted by country
List of astronomical observatories
Yantra
Mantra

References

External links

 Jantar Mantar - The Astronomical Observatories of Jai Singh II,  "a project initiated by Cornell University Professor of Art, Barry Perlus"
 Pictures with French text
 Jantar Mantar Jaipur Timings, Entry Fee
 India's mysterious gateway to the stars BBC Travel (2022-05-31)

 Ancient astronomical observatories
 Archaeoastronomy
 Astronomical observatories in India
 Buildings and structures in Delhi
 History of science and technology in India
 Rajput architecture